Globo (meaning globe in Portuguese, Spanish and Italian) may refer to:

Grupo Globo, a Brazilian conglomerate primarily in mass media
TV Globo, a television network 
GloboNews, a television 24-hour news channel
Globo (Portuguese TV channel)
Canais Globo, a satellite TV service; also in Portugal
O Globo, a newspaper
Globo Filmes, a movie production company
Editora Globo, a publishing house
Globo Marcas, a branding and marketing company
Globo Futebol Clube, a Brazilian football club
Il Globo, an Italian-language newspaper published in Australia
Radio Globo (Honduras), a radio station